Chingaza may refer to:
 Chingaza Natural National Park, a national park, commonly called "Chingaza", east of Bogotá, Colombia
 Chingaza Dam, a dam in the park
 Ischnura chingaza, a species of dragonfly described from Chingaza National Park
 Araneus chingaza, a species of spider, idem
 Polylobus chingaza, a species of beetle, idem